Russell Stuart Winer is an American econometrician and academic administrator. He is the William Joyce Professor of Marketing at the New York University Stern School of Business and dean of the department of business administration at the University of the People.

Education 
Winer completed a B.A. in economics with Phi Beta Kappa honors at Union College in 1973. He earned a M.S. (1975) and Ph.D. (1977) in industrial administration from Carnegie Mellon University. His dissertation was titled An econometric analysis of the effect of advertising on consumer behavior. Richard Staelin was Winer's doctoral advisor.

Career 
Winer was a consultant for American Airlines, New York Telephone, Ogilvy & Mather, and Dancer Fitzgerald Sample. In the 1980s, he was a faculty member of the Owen Graduate School of Management at Vanderbilt University. In 1986, Winer joined the marketing firm, Nashville Consulting Group to perform conjoint analyses related to purchase decisions. 

Since 2009, Winer has been the dean of the department of business administration at the University of the People. He leads the institution's Master of Business Administration program.

Winer is the William Joyce Professor of Marketing and has been chair of the marketing department at the New York University Stern School of Business. He has taught at the Indian School of Management and Entrepreneurship, Mumbai and has written three books and over 70 papers on marketing.

In 2015, Winer became a fellow of the American Marketing Association.

Winer has supported Sharpie's modern advertising methods, calling it "a really interesting, multichannel campaign". He has spoken about the difficulties when multiple brands are in a marketplace, and thinks the choice can sometimes overwhelm consumers. Along with Itamar Simonson, Winer has conducted research on shopping behavior.

Selected works

Books

Journal articles

References

External links 

 

Living people
Year of birth missing (living people)
Place of birth missing (living people)
Marketing theorists
University of the People faculty
American university and college faculty deans
Business school deans
Union College (New York) alumni
Carnegie Mellon University alumni
Columbia Business School faculty
Vanderbilt University faculty
Haas School of Business faculty
New York University Stern School of Business faculty
Management scientists
American business theorists
20th-century American male writers
21st-century American male writers
20th-century American non-fiction writers
21st-century American non-fiction writers
American male non-fiction writers
Fellows of the American Marketing Association
Journal of Marketing Research editors